Jean-Luc Masdupuy (born 14 April 1969) is a former French racing cyclist. He finished in last place in the 1996 Tour de France.

References

External links
 

1969 births
Living people
French male cyclists
Sportspeople from Haute-Vienne
Cyclists from Nouvelle-Aquitaine